Joshua Reynolds (born February 16, 1995) is an American football wide receiver for the Detroit Lions of the National Football League (NFL). He played college football at Texas A&M and holds the school's season receiving touchdown record with 13, set in 2014. Reynolds was drafted by the Los Angeles Rams in the fourth round of the 2017 NFL Draft.

Early years
Reynolds was born on February 16, 1995, in San Antonio, Texas. He is the son of Michele Reynolds and the older brother of Moses Reynolds, a freshman defensive back for the Texas A&M Aggies.

Reynolds attended and  played wide receiver and safety for the John Jay High School Mustangs high school football team. As a senior, he had a total of 44 catches for 667 yards and 48 tackles with three interceptions. Reynolds finished his high school career with a total of 102 receptions for 1859 yards on 22 touchdowns. Out of high school Reynolds was rated as three-star recruit by 247Sports.com and Rivals.com. He gained interest from a few NCAA Division I program, including Oregon State. Reynolds made a campus visit to Oregon State, but a few weeks later the Beavers informed Reynolds that all the wide receiver roster spots for the team's recruiting class were filled. Reynolds then signed with Tyler Junior College.

College career

Tyler Junior College (2013)
As a freshman at Tyler Junior College in 2013, Reynolds accumulated a total of 782 yards on 44 catches and was named to the second-team all conference. After his better than average freshman season he managed to pick up a couple offers as he was ranked a three-star junior college recruit by Rivals.com. Most notable offers were from his Texas A&M and Oregon. Other schools did offer him after his freshman season as well as Boise State and TCU. Reynolds then signed and chose to play college football for Texas A&M.

Texas A&M

2014 season 
In his first season at Texas A&M, in 2014, Reynolds was an instant contributor. In his first game with the Aggies, he had six receptions for 76 receiving yards and one receiving touchdown in a victory over South Carolina. On September 13, against Rice, he had two receptions for 68 receiving yards and two receiving touchdowns. The next week, against SMU, he had a 70-yard receiving touchdown. In the following game, against Arkansas, he had four receptions for 89 receiving yards and a receiving touchdown. The next week, against Mississippi State, he had seven receptions for 66 receiving yards and two receiving touchdowns. On November 8, against Auburn, he had six receptions for 88 receiving yards and two receiving touchdowns. In the following game, against Missouri, he had five receptions for 125 receiving yards and two receiving touchdowns. Overall, he caught 52 passes for 842 receiving yards and 13 receiving touchdowns. The 13 touchdowns set a Texas A&M Aggies season school record, breaking the mark of 12 previously held by Pro Bowler Mike Evans and  Jeff Fuller. He finished seventh in receptions, fourth in receiving yards, and second in receiving touchdowns in the SEC.

2015 
Reynolds started off the season with three receiving touchdowns in the first three games, victories over Arizona State, Ball State, and Nevada. On September 26, against Arkansas, he had three receptions for 106 receiving yards. In the following game, against Mississippi State, he had a then career-high 141 receiving yards on seven receptions. On November 21, against Vanderbilt, he had three receptions for 105 receiving yards and one receiving touchdown. As a junior, Reynolds totaled 51 receptions for 907 receiving yards and five receiving touchdowns. In the last game of his junior year, against Louisville on December 30, 2015, in the 2015 Music City Bowl, Reynolds recorded career highs in receptions (11) and receiving yards (177). He finished sixth in receiving yards in the SEC in 2015.

2016 
Going into his senior season, Reynolds had the choice of entering the National Football League Draft or staying for his final year with Texas A&M. In October 2015, the NFL Network ranked Reynolds as one of the best prospects in college football. Reynolds chose to stay at Texas A&M. Reynolds started the season with four receptions for 78 receiving yards and a receiving touchdown against UCLA. Two weeks later, against Auburn, he had seven receptions for 98 receiving yards and a receiving touchdown. On September 24, against Arkansas, he had four receptions for 141 receiving yards and a receiving touchdown. On October 8, against Tennessee in a 45–38 2OT victory, he had five receptions for 89 receiving yards and one receiving touchdown. The Tennessee game started a streak of eight consecutive games with a receiving touchdown for Reynolds. In his final collegiate game, the 2016 Texas Bowl against Kansas State, he had 12 receptions for 154 receiving yards and two receiving touchdowns. He finished his college career with A&M with receiving touchdowns (12) and receiving yards (1,039). He finished the 2016 season leading the SEC in receiving yards and receiving touchdowns. Reynolds studied recreation, park, and tourism science at Texas A&M.

Collegiate statistics

Professional career

Los Angeles Rams
Reynolds received an invitation to the Senior Bowl. He was selected in the fourth round, 117th overall, by the Los Angeles Rams in the 2017 NFL Draft. On June 21, 2017, the Rams signed Reynolds to a four-year contract.

During Week 2 against the Washington Redskins, Reynolds made his NFL debut with a 28-yard pass reception on a successful fake punt from Johnny Hekker. During Week 12 against the New Orleans Saints, Reynolds made his first NFL start, catching four passes for 37 yards and a 7-yard touchdown pass from Jared Goff to help the Rams win 26-20. Reynolds finished his rookie season with 11 catches for 104 yards and a touchdown.

Reynolds began the 2018 season as a backup, but after fellow wide receiver Cooper Kupp went down with a season-ending torn ACL, Reynolds had an increased role in the offense, starting eight total games, including the final six of the regular season. He finished the season with 29 receptions for 402 yards and five touchdowns. He helped the Rams earn the No. 2-seed in the NFC Playoffs. The Rams defeated the Dallas Cowboys by a score of 30–22 in the Divisional Round with Reynolds having a 19-yard reception. In the NFC Championship, Reynolds had four receptions for 74 yards as the Rams defeated the New Orleans Saints on the road by a score of 26–23 in overtime. The Rams faced the New England Patriots in Super Bowl LIII. Reynolds recorded three catches for 28 yards, but the Rams lost 13-3.

In the 2019 season, Reynolds finished with 21 receptions for 326 yards and a touchdown.

Tennessee Titans 

On March 23, 2021, Reynolds signed a one-year contract with the Tennessee Titans. On November 9, 2021, Reynolds was waived.

Detroit Lions
On November 10, 2021, Reynolds was claimed off waivers by the Detroit Lions. In the 2021 season, Reynolds finished with 29 receptions for 396 yards and two receiving touchdowns.

On March 9, 2022, Reynolds signed a two-year, $6 million contract extension with the Lions.

NFL career statistics

Regular season

Postseason

References

External links
 Detroit Lions bio
 Texas A&M Aggies bio

1995 births
Living people
21st-century African-American sportspeople
American football wide receivers
African-American players of American football
Players of American football from San Antonio
Texas A&M Aggies football players
Tyler Apaches football players
Los Angeles Rams players
Tennessee Titans players
Detroit Lions players